Non-wires alternatives (NWAs) are electric utility system investments and operating practices that can defer or replace the need for specific transmission and/or distribution projects, at lower total resource cost, by reliably reducing transmission congestion or distribution system constraints at times of maximum demand in specific grid areas. Transmission-related NWAs are also known as non-transmission alternatives (NTAs). They can be identified through least-cost planning and action, one geographic area at a time, for managing electricity supply and demand using all means available and necessary, including demand response, distributed generation (DG), energy efficiency, electricity and thermal storage, load management, and rate design.

Examples of States Using NWAs
 Maine's Booth Bay Harbor Pilot Project
 California “loading order” and energy storage mandates
 Public purpose, including microgrid projects under development in Connecticut, Maryland, Massachusetts, New Jersey and New York
 Massachusetts’ required grid modernization plans
 New York's Brooklyn/Queens Demand Management Program
 Vermont's transmission deferral projects

References

Electric power generation
Distributed generation
Electricity economics